144th meridian may refer to:

144th  meridian east, a line of longitude east of the Greenwich Meridian
144th meridian west, a line of longitude west of the Greenwich Meridian